The Engine Room Acoustic Session is an EP released by The King Blues in 2008. It was available exclusively at their album release show at the Carling Academy Islington, London on October 22, 2008. Fans were able to sign up online to receive a signed copy, requesting a message of up to ten words be written by the band, and the CD was made available for collection at the gig. All four tracks are performed acoustic, tracks 2 and 4 are taken from their second album Save The World. Get The Girl while "A New England" is a cover of Billy Bragg's song and "Needle & Thread" was previously unreleased.

Track listing

"A New England"  - 2:30
"Save the World, Get the Girl"  - 2:51
"Needle & Thread" - 2:56
"Hold On Tight" - 3:48

References

The King Blues albums
2008 EPs